V831 Centauri is a multiple star system in the constellation Centaurus. It is visible to the naked eye with an apparent visual magnitude that ranges from 4.49 down to 4.66. The system is located at a distance of approximately 380 light years from the Sun based on parallax, and is drifting further away with a radial velocity of +12 km/s. It is a likely member of the Lower Centaurus Crux concentration of the Sco OB2 association of co-moving stars.

The magnitude 5.3 primary component forms a near-contact binary system, with the components designated Aa and Ab. The larger member has 4.1 times the mass of the Sun and 2.4 times the Sun's radius, while the companion has 3.4 and 2.3 times, respectively. The pair form an eclipsing system, and it is classed as a rotating ellipsoidal variable.

The third star, component B, is magnitude 6.0 and forms a visual pair, designated See 170, with the inner system. They orbit each other with a period of 27.2 years and an eccentricity of 0.5. This star has a mass about 2.5 times that of the Sun and may be an Ap star. The fourth member, component C, orbits the system with a period of around 2,000 years. There is a fifth member, component D.

References

B-type main-sequence stars
Lower Centaurus Crux
Rotating ellipsoidal variables

Centaurus (constellation)
Durchmusterung objects
114529
4975
064425
Centauri, V831
Ap stars